The Super Bowl of Poker (also known as Amarillo Slim's Super Bowl of Poker or SBOP) was the second most prestigious poker tournament in the world during the 1980s.  While the World Series of Poker was already drawing larger crowds as more and more amateurs sought it out, the SBOP "was an affair limited almost exclusively to pros and hard-core amateurs."

Prior to 1979, the only high dollar tournament a person could enter was the WSOP.  1972 WSOP Main Event Champion and outspoken ambassador for poker Amarillo Slim saw this as an opportunity.  "The World Series of Poker was so successful that everybody wanted more than one tournament," he said.  Slim called upon his connections and friendships with poker's elite to start a new tournament in the February 1979.  Before the SBOP had developed a reputation of its own, many of the most respected names in poker attended the tournament "more to support Slim and take advantage of the very fat cash games the event would obviously inspire."  Slim modelled his SBOP after the WSOP with several events and a $10,000 Texas Hold'em Main Event.

One of the principal differences between the WSOP and the SBOP was the prize structure.  The WSOP's prize structure was flat ensuring more people received smaller pieces of the prize pool.  The SBOP typically used a 60-30-10 payout structure.  In other words, only the first three places received money and generally in the ratio of 60% to first place, 30% to second place, and 10% to third.  This payment schedule predominated the SBOP for the first 5 years of the event, but as the event grew the number of payouts increased while keeping the payout schedule top heavy.

1989 Tournament

The 1989 SBOP was the third time wherein Poker Hall of Famer Stu Ungar won the Main Event.  Ungar was the only person to win back-to-back tournaments and the only person to win the SBOP three times.  Ungar was also the only person to win the WSOP Main Event three times.  While Johnny Moss is a three-time WSOP Main Event winner, his first victory came as a result of a vote rather than the elimination tournament that it would assume the following year.  Berry Johnston, another Hall of Famer, also won an event by claiming the title in the $200 Pot Limit Omaha with Rebuys tournament.  Relatively little is preserved about the 1989 tournament.  In most cases, the only thing that has been preserved was the name of the event winners, and in a few cases not even that much was recorded.

Key

Event 1: $2,500 Lowball 

 Number of buy-ins: Unknown
 Total prize pool: Unknown
 Number of payouts: Unknown
 Reference:

Event 2: $400 Ladies Seven Card Stud  

 Number of buy-ins: Unknown
 Total prize pool: Unknown
 Number of payouts: Unknown
 Reference:

Event 3: $500 Limit Hold'em   

 Number of buy-ins: Unknown
 Total prize pool: Unknown
 Number of payouts: Unknown
 Reference:

Event 4: $1,000 Lowball   

 Number of buy-ins: Unknown
 Total prize pool: Unknown
 Number of payouts: Unknown
 Reference:

Event 5: $500 Seven Card Razz    

 Number of buy-ins: Unknown
 Total prize pool: Unknown
 Number of payouts: Unknown
 Reference:

Event 6: $500 Limit 7 Card Stud    

 Number of buy-ins: Unknown
 Total prize pool: Unknown
 Number of payouts: Unknown
 Reference:

Event 8: $200 Pot Limit Omaha with Rebuys   

 Number of buy-ins: 183
 Total prize pool: $208,100
 Number of payouts: 9
 Reference:

Event 9: $1,000 7 Card Stud Hi/Lo    

 Number of buy-ins: Unknown
 Total prize pool: Unknown
 Number of payouts: Unknown
 Reference:

Event 11: $1,000 Limit Hold'em    

 Number of buy-ins: Unknown
 Total prize pool: Unknown
 Number of payouts: Unknown
 Reference:

Event 12: $200 Pot Limit Omaha with Rebuys    

 Number of buy-ins: Unknown
 Total prize pool: Unknown
 Number of payouts: Unknown
 Reference:

Event 13: $1,500 Limit 7 Card Stud   

 Number of buy-ins: Unknown
 Total prize pool: Unknown
 Number of payouts: Unknown
 Reference:

Event 14: $1,500 No Limit Hold'em   

 Number of buy-ins: Unknown
 Total prize pool: Unknown
 Number of payouts: Unknown
 Reference:

Event 15: Limit 7 Card Stud   

 Number of buy-ins: Unknown
 Total prize pool: Unknown
 Number of payouts: Unknown
 Reference:

Event 16: $10,000 No Limit Hold'em - Super Bowl of Poker   

 Number of buy-ins: Unknown
 Total prize pool: Unknown
 Number of payouts: Unknown
 Reference:

References

Super Bowl of Poker
1989 in poker